Percy Precinct is located in Randolph County, Illinois, United States. At the 2010 census, its population was 1,223.

Geography

References

Precincts in Randolph County, Illinois